The 2011 Superbike World Championship was the twenty-fourth season of the Superbike World Championship. It began on 27 February at Phillip Island and finished on 16 October in Portimão after 13 rounds.

The knockout system introduced for Superpole in 2009 was revised as the number of riders admitted to the first two sessions was reduced from twenty to sixteen and from sixteen to twelve respectively.

Ducati no longer competed with a factory team in 2011, after 23 seasons which had brought the marque a total of 29 riders' and manufacturers' championship titles, instead limiting its participation to privateer teams running their works bikes.

After a dominating since season opening, Carlos Checa won his first championship and Ducati's 17th manufacturer title.

Race calendar and results
The provisional race schedule was publicly announced by the FIM on 7 October 2010 with eleven confirmed rounds and two other rounds pending confirmation. Having been announced as a venue from 2011 onwards in May 2010, Motorland Aragon replaced Kyalami on the calendar, while Donington Park returned to the championship, hosting the European round. Imola was confirmed in November 2010, to finalise a 13-round calendar. All races with the exception of Miller Motorsports Park – races held on Memorial Day Monday – were held on Sundays.

Championship standings

Riders' standings

Manufacturers' standings

Entry list

All entries used Pirelli tyres.

References

External links

 
Superbike World Championship seasons
World